Santa Rita is a municipality in the Honduran department of Santa Bárbara.

Demographics
At the time of the 2013 Honduras census, Santa Rita municipality had a population of 3,975. Of these, 84.18% were Mestizo, 15.49% White, 0.18% Indigenous and 0.15% Black or Afro-Honduran.

References

Municipalities of the Santa Bárbara Department, Honduras